In computability theory, index sets describe classes of computable functions; specifically, they give all indices of functions in a certain class, according to a fixed Gödel numbering of partial computable functions.

Definition
Let  be a computable enumeration of all partial computable functions, and  be a computable enumeration of all c.e. sets.

Let  be a class of partial computable functions. Intuitively, these are the sets of natural numbers that we describe only with reference to the functions they index.

Index sets and Rice's theorem
Most index sets are non-computable, aside from two trivial exceptions. This is stated in Rice's theorem:

Let  be a class of partial computable functions with its index set .

Rice's theorem says "any nontrivial property of partial computable functions is undecidable".

Completeness in the arithmetical hierarchy 
Index sets provide many examples of sets which are complete at some level of the arithmetical hierarchy. Here are some examples:

  is -complete.
  is -complete.
  is -complete.
  is -complete.
  is -complete.
  is -complete.
  is -complete.
  is -complete.
  is -complete, where  is the halting problem.

Empirically, if the "most obvious" definition of a set  is  [resp. ], we can usually show that  is -complete [resp. -complete].

Notes

References
 

Computability theory